Aria Fischer (born March 2, 1999) is an American water polo player. She represented the United States at the 2016 Summer Olympics and currently plays water polo at Stanford University.

Personal life
Fischer's older sister, Makenzie Fischer, is also on the American Women's National Team for Water Polo. Fischer graduated from Laguna Beach High School in 2017 and is currently majoring in Creative Writing at Stanford University.

See also
 United States women's Olympic water polo team records and statistics
 List of Olympic champions in women's water polo
 List of Olympic medalists in water polo (women)
 List of world champions in women's water polo
 List of World Aquatics Championships medalists in water polo

References

External links
 
 

1999 births
Living people
American female water polo players
Water polo centre forwards
Water polo players at the 2016 Summer Olympics
Medalists at the 2016 Summer Olympics
Olympic gold medalists for the United States in water polo
World Aquatics Championships medalists in water polo
Water polo players at the 2019 Pan American Games
Pan American Games medalists in water polo
Pan American Games gold medalists for the United States
Universiade medalists in water polo
Universiade gold medalists for the United States
Medalists at the 2017 Summer Universiade
Medalists at the 2019 Pan American Games
Water polo players at the 2020 Summer Olympics
People from Laguna Beach, California
Medalists at the 2020 Summer Olympics
21st-century American women
Stanford Cardinal women's water polo players